Richard T. Swope (November 21, 1942 – January 8, 2011) was a lieutenant general in the United States Air Force who served as the Inspector General of the United States Air Force from 1996 until his retirement in 1998.

Awards and decorations

Personal life
General Swope was an avid aviation enthusiast as demonstrated by personally constructing and test flying a Vans Aircraft RV-8 amateur built experimental aircraft of which he was the repairmen.

Death
After retirement, General Swope suffered an unexpected death while skiing at the Whitefish Mountain Resort in Montana on January 8, 2011.

References

People from Binghamton, New York
United States Air Force generals
Recipients of the Air Force Distinguished Service Medal
Recipients of the Legion of Merit
Recipients of the Distinguished Flying Cross (United States)
Recipients of the Air Medal
Recipients of the Defense Superior Service Medal
1942 births
2011 deaths
Recipients of the Meritorious Service Medal (United States)